The list of Hunter College people includes notable graduates, professors and other people affiliated with Hunter College of the City University of New York.

Alumni

Nobel laureates 
 Gertrude B. Elion - 1988, Medicine
 Rosalyn Sussman Yalow - 1977, Medicine

Pulitzer Prize winners 
 Holland Cotter - art critic
 Emily Grenauer - art critic
 Ada Louise Huxtable - architecture critic
 Liu Heung Sheng - photographer
 James Wright - poet

National Medal of Science winners 
 Mildred Cohn - 1982, Biological Sciences
 Mildred Dresselhaus - Engineering Sciences
 Gertrude B. Elion

Presidential Medal of Freedom winners 
 Antonia Pantoja - activist

Science, technology, medicine, and mathematics 
 Patricia Bath - ophthalmologist
 Marjorie Clarke - environmental scientist
 Mildred Cohn - National Medal of Science winner
 Mary P. Dolciani - mathematician
 Elsie Giorgi - physician
 Erich Jarvis - neurologist
 Esther Lederberg - pioneer of bacterial genetics
 Lena Levine - psychiatrist, gynecologist, pioneer of marriage counseling and birth control
 Beatrice Mintz - pioneer of mammalian transgenesis 
 Arlie Petters - pioneer of gravitational lensing
 Mina Rees - mathematician, President of the American Association for the Advancement of Science
 Gillian Reynolds 1988 - third African American woman to earn a Ph.D. in Physics from M.I.T.
 Ruth Teitelbaum - ENIAC programmer
 Rosalyn Sussman Yalow - Nobel prize winner in Medicine

Business and economics 
 Gerard Cafesjian - owner of West Publishing Corporation (now part of Thomson Corporation)
 Alan S. Chartock - president and CEO of WAMC
 Leon Cooperman - billionaire hedge fund manager 
 Robert A. Daly - CEO of Warner Bros. and the Los Angeles Dodgers
 Mollie Orshansky - developer of the Orshansky Poverty Thresholds, the main poverty measure in the US
 Sylvia Field Porter - economist and journalist
Melvin T. Tukman - co-founder and president of Tukman Grossman Capital Management, an investment firm.

Law and politics

Members of Congress 
 Bella Abzug - Congresswoman, 1971-1977
 Eliot L. Engel - Congressman, 1989–present
 Edna F. Kelly - Congresswoman, 1949-1969

State figures 
 Teresa Patterson Hughes - California State Senator
 Roger Manno - Maryland House of Delegates

City figures 
 Tony Avella - New York City councilman, 2009 candidate for mayor
 Adolfo Carrión Jr. - Bronx borough president
 Tom Murphy - mayor of Pittsburgh
 John Timoney - Miami chief of police

Lawyers 
 Floria Lasky - prominent theater lawyer
 Soia Mentschikoff - chief developer of the Uniform Commercial Code and first woman to teach at Harvard Law School

Activists 
 Norma Becker - anti-war activist
 Madeleine Cosman - health care and immigration advocate
 Alexander Dvorkin - anti-cult activist
 Theodora Lacey - civil rights activist
 Audre Lorde - activist, writer, poet
 Pauli Murray - activist, lawyer, priest, and author
 Antonia Pantoja - activist, Presidential Medal of Freedom winner
 Mamphela Ramphele - Rockefeller Foundation trustee, anti-apartheid activist
 Sandra Schnur - pioneer of disability rights
 Judith Vladeck - labor lawyer and civil rights advocate

Journalism and news 
 Mohamad Bazzi - journalist
 Richard Cohen - Washington Post columnist
 Corine Hegland - journalist
 Jack Newfield - muckraking journalist
 Shimon Prokupecz - CNN reporter
 Daniel Seaman - Israeli politician; expert on the Arab-Israeli conflict

Literature 
 Grace Andreacchi - writer
 Maurice Berger - cultural critic 
 Peter Carey - writer
 Colin Channer - writer 
 Helen Gray Cone - poet
 Lucy Dawidowicz - author
 Martin Greif - writer, publisher
Kaitlyn Greenidge - writer
 Evan Hunter - author and screenwriter
 Ada Louise Huxtable - writer, Pulitzer Prize-winning architectural critic
 Colette Inez - poet, academic
Swati Khurana - writer
 Malka Lee - poet
 Audre Lorde - poet, essayist
 Paule Marshall - author, MacArthur Fellow  "genius grant," Dos Passos Prize for Literature
 Barbara McMartin - environmental writer
 Melissa Plaut - writer
 Sylvia Field Porter - economist, journalist
 Sonia Sanchez - poet
 Augusta Huiell Seaman - writer
Sadia Shephard - writer
 Gary Shteyngart - author
 René Taupin - writer
 Ned Vizzini - writer
 Joan Wolf - writer of romance novels
 James Wright - poet
 Ricky Anne Loew-Beer - Author, Artist & Photographer (married to fashion designer Ralph Lauren)

Film, theater, and television 
 Ellen Barkin - actress
 Lewis Beale - film critic
 Ed Burns - actor, director
 Eva Condon - Broadway actress
 Judith Crist - film critic
 Ruby Dee - actress
 Vin Diesel - actor
 Hugh Downs - broadcaster, 20/20 and The Today Show anchor
 Tina Howe - Tony-nominated playwright
 Chad Hunt - director
 Richard Jeni - comedian
 Suzanne Kaaren - actress
 Ephraim Katz - author of The Film Encyclopedia
 Evelyn Lear - opera singer
 Natasha Leggero - actress and comic
 Maitland McDonagh - film critic
 Daniel Mulloy - screenwriter and film director
 Julianne Nicholson - actress
 Rhea Perlman - actress
 Dascha Polanco - actress
 Esther Rolle - actress
 Regina Resnik - opera singer
 Al Santos - actor
 Elliot Tiber - screenwriter who "saved" Woodstock Festival
 Dreya Weber - producer

Art, architecture, and engineering 
 Robert Altman - Rolling Stone photojournalist
 Firelei Báez - artist
 Maurice Berger - art critic and historian
 Jack Coggins - illustrator
 Francisco Costa - creative director of Calvin Klein Collection
 Jules de Balincourt - artist
 Jacqueline Donachie - artist
 Mildred Dresselhaus - engineer
 Echo Eggebrecht - painter
 Arthur Elgort - photographer for Vogue magazine
 Gabriele Evertz - abstract artist 
 Denise Green - painter
 Ada Louise Huxtable - architecture critic
 Mel Kendrick - artist
 Kathleen Kucka - painter
 Terrance Lindall - artist
 Robert Morris - sculptor
 Doug Ohlson -  abstract artist
 Lucy Olcott - art historian and dealer
 Mitchell Silver - urban planner
Jeff Sonhouse - (MFA 2001), painter
 Louis A. Waldman - art historian
 Dan Walsh - painter
 Brian Wood - visual artist

Music 
 David Sampson - composer
 Ashley Choi - lead singer of the band Ladies' Code

Military 
 Thomas P. Noonan, Jr. - Medal of Honor recipient

Education 
 Robert Davila - ninth president of Gallaudet University
 Howard McParlin Davis - prominent art history professor
 John Taylor Gatto - author of seminal books on education
Francis Kilcoyne (died 1985) - President of Brooklyn College
 Soia Mentschikoff - chief developer of the Uniform Commercial Code and first woman to teach at Harvard University
 Burton Pike - professor Emeritus, Comparative Literature, CUNY Graduate Center
 Jennifer Raab - president of Hunter College
 Henning Rübsam - choreographer, dance historian The Juilliard School
 Kay Toliver - mathematics educator

Fictional alumni 
 Chad Kroski
 Harry "Parry" Sagan from The Fisher King
 Daniel Bae from The Sun Is Also a Star

Non-graduating attendees 
 Harry Connick, Jr - musician
 Bobby Darin - musician
 Nikolai Fraiture - bassist, The Strokes
 April Lee Hernández - actress
 Grace Paley - writer
 Nick Valensi - guitarist, The Strokes
 Mitski - musician

Faculty 

 Meena Alexander - poet and author
 James Aronson - journalist, founder of the National Guardian
 John Avlon - author, speech writer for Rudy Giuliani
 Jacqueline Barton - chemist
 William Baziotes - painter
 Harry Binswanger - philosopher
 Gertrude Blanch - pioneer of numerical analysis and computation
 Robert A. Brady - economist
 José Ferrer Canales - writer, activist
 Rosario Candela - influential architect 
 Peter Carey - novelist
 Tina Chang - poet
 John Henrik Clarke - historian
 Buck Clayton - musician
 Daniel I. A. Cohen - mathematician and computer scientist
 Janet Cox-Rearick - art historian
 Noah Creshevsky - composer
 Susan Crile - painter
 Emil Draitser - author
 Cora DuBois - cultural anthropologist
 Stuart Ewen
 Norman Finkelstein - political scientist
 Mary Flanagan
 Helen Frankenthaler - artist
 Bertram Myron Gross - author of the Humphrey-Hawkins Full Employment Act
 John Hollander - poet, literary critic
 Seymour Itzkoff - researcher
 George E. Kimball - pioneer of operations research algorithms
 Dong Kingman - artist
 Lyman Kipp - sculptor
 Rosalind E. Krauss - art critic
 Reiner Leist - photographer
 Nancy Milford - author
 Paul Moravec - composer
 Robert Motherwell - artist
 Leonard Peikoff - philosopher, founder of the Ayn Rand Institute
 Mina Rees - mathematician
 Richard Reeves - political author
 Ruth Sager - geneticist
 Carolee Schneemann - artist
 Blake Schwarzenbach - musician
 Michael Shernoff - specialist in gay community mental health
 Tony Smith - sculptor
 Harry Edward Stinson - sculptor
 John Kennedy Toole - author
 Lionel Trilling - literary critic
 Nydia Velázquez - U.S. Congresswoman, New York, 1993–present
 Alice von Hildebrand - philosopher and author
 Robert C. Weaver - first U.S. Secretary of Housing and Urban Development
 Blanche Colton Williams, professor of English literature and head of the English department
 Nari Ward, professor of combined media

Administration 
 David A. Caputo - president of Hunter College; president of Pace University
 Paul LeClerc - president of Hunter College; president and CEO of New York Public Library
 Michael P. Riccards - political scientist; author; executive director of the Hall Institute for Public Policy
 Donna Shalala - U.S. Secretary of Health and Human Services; 10th president of Hunter College; president of University of Miami

References 

Hunter College